BLISTT (informally, Metro Baguio) is an agglomeration of the city of Baguio and five municipalities of the Philippines province of Benguet, namely: La Trinidad, Itogon, Sablan, Tuba, and Tublay.

Long proposed and supported by the NEDA-Regional Development Council-Cordillera, it as one of twelve defined metropolitan areas in the Philippines. The original "BLIST" long existed as a concept since its inception in August 1990, a month after the 1990 earthquake which devastated the city of Baguio and other surrounding areas, and only existed as an informal reference to the area. The concept was later amended into "BLISTT" in 2009, which included the municipality of Tublay, despite not being adjacent to the city of Baguio. It was officially established after a signing of a memorandum of agreement by the mayors of the component local government units.

Component local government units
BLISTT, like Metro Manila and Metro Cebu, is not an administrative political unit but an agglomeration of independent local government units (LGUs), the third level government in the Philippine political system.

History
The original BLIST concept was visualized by the key stakeholders in August 1990 after the 1990 Luzon earthquake devastated Baguio.
Supported by a European Union grant in 1992, the BLIST Urban Plan was completed in 1994, which aimed to reconstruct the city following the earthquake and to reduce overcrowding in the city. The concept was not supported by the component Benguet municipalities of La Trinidad, Itogon, Sablan, and Tuba such that it was prepared with little consultation, and was primarily developed for the sole convenience of Baguio.

In 2009, the municipality of Tublay in the Province of Benguet was included in the new BLISTT plan as revived by the Regional Development Council of the Cordillera Administrative Region (RDC-CAR).
 
The concept had long been pushed through by the city government of Baguio, for the prime purpose of alleviating the city's overpopulation and decongestion problems. It was criticized by other government officials as heavily geared towards the alleviating of the problems of Baguio.

It was officially established after a signing of a memorandum of agreement by the mayors of the component LGUs. The first set of council officials were elected on February 27, 2014, with Baguio Mayor Mauricio Domogan as Chairman, Sablan Mayor Arthur Baldo as Co-Chairman, La Trinidad Mayor Edna Tabanda as Treasurer, and Tublay Mayor Ruben Paoad as Secretary, all of whom would serve for a one-year term.

Geography and climate

Geography
Most of the metropolitan area, like Baguio, is located some 1,500 meters above sea level, nestled within the Cordillera Central mountain range in northern Luzon. It covers a total area of 1094.79 square kilometers.

Climate
BLISTT features a subtropical highland climate under the Köppen climate classification. The area is known for its mild climate. Owing to its high elevation, the temperature is 8 degrees Celsius lower compared to the average temperature of the rest of the country. Average temperature ranges from 15 to 23 degrees Celsius. It is usually lower during the late and early months of the year. The lowest recorded temperature in Baguio was 6.3 degrees Celsius on January 18, 1961. This is in contrast to the all-time high of 30.4 degrees Celsius recorded on March 15, 1988, during the 1988 El Niño season. Baguio seldom exceeds 26 degrees Celsius even during the warmest part of the year.
Like many other cities with a subtropical highland climate, BLISTT sees noticeably less precipitation during its “low-sun” months. The metropolitan area though sees an extraordinary amount of precipitation during its wetter months, with the months of July and August seeing on average more than 1,000 mm of rain. BLISTT averages over 4500 mm of precipitation annually.

Government
Unlike Metro Manila, BLISTT, before the signing of the MOA, didn't have a government that directly administered the area. However, on February 27, 2014, the first set of council officials were elected, with Baguio Mayor Mauricio Domogan as Chairman, Sablan Mayor Arthur Baldo as Co-Chairman, La Trinidad Mayor Edna Tabanda as Treasurer, and Tublay Mayor Ruben Paoad as Secretary, all of whom would serve for a one-year term.

Media
All Metro Baguio's Radio and Television stations, Cable and Satellite TV providers and broadcast transmitters and Local Newspapers.

AM Stations
DZWT Radyo Totoo 540 (Catholic Media Network)
DZWX Bombo Radyo 1035 (Bombo Radyo Philippines)
RPN DZBS Radyo Ronda 1368 (Radio Philippines Network)

FM Stations
89.5 Star FM (Bombo Radyo Philippines)
RJ FM 91.1 (Rajah Broadcasting Network)
91.9 Easy Rock (Manila Broadcasting Company)
Barangay FM 92.7 (GMA Network, Inc.)
93.7 Radyo Pilipinas (Philippine Broadcasting Service) (former AM frequency of 999 kHz from 1965 to 2021)
94.3 FMR (Philippine Collective Media Corporation)
95.1 Love Radio (Manila Broadcasting Company)
95.9 Big Sound FM (Vanguard Radio Network)
96.7 K-Lite (Beta Broadcasting System)
Cool 97.5 (UBC Media, Inc.)
98.7 Z-Radio (University of Baguio & Benguet Broadcasting Corporation)
99.9 Country (Catholic Media Network)
Radyo5 102.3 News FM (Nation Broadcasting Corporation)
MOR 103.1 (ABS-CBN Corporation; now defunct) 
iFM 103.9 (Radio Mindanao Network)
105.1 Q Radio (Mareco Broadcasting Network)
107.1 MemoRieS FM (Primax Broadcasting Network)

TV Stations
ABS-CBN Baguio Channel 3 (now defunct)
IBC Baguio Channel 6
PTV Baguio Channel 8
GMA Baguio Channel 10 (via Dagupan's TV station)
RPN Baguio Channel 12
GTV Baguio Channel 22
Hope Channel Philippines Baguio Channel 24 (via Dagupan's TV Station)
BEAM TV Baguio Channel 26
TV5 Baguio Channel 28
One Sports Baguio Channel 36
GNN Channel 44

Cable & Satellite TV Providers
Sky Cable Baguio - (Baguio & La Trinidad)
Mountainview Satellite Corporation - (Baguio, La Trinidad, Sablan & Tuba)
Comclark Cable TV Network - (Itogon & Tublay)
A. B. Bejerano Cable TV - (Tuba)
Cignal TV - (Metro Baguio)
G Sat - (Metro Baguio)

Newspapers
Baguio Midland Courier
Sun Star Baguio
Herald Express
Zig Zag Weekly
Herald Express
Amianan Balita Ngayon
Philippine Daily Inquirer
Manila Bulletin
Tempo
Balita
The Philippine Star
Pilipino Star Ngayon
People's Journal
Brigada News Philippines - Newspaper Baguio Edition

Transportation

On land
Three main access roads lead to the city of Baguio from the lowlands; Kennon Road, Aspiras-Palispis Highway (formerly Marcos Highway), and Naguilian Road (also known as Quirino Highway). Kennon Road starts from Rosario in La Union province, and winds through a narrow, steep valley. Although perilous and being prone to landslides during rainy season, it is the fastest route to Baguio from the lowlands, and offers a scenic view. Aspiras Highway, which starts from Agoo, La Union and connects to Palispis Highway at Benguet-La Union highway border, and Naguilian Road, which starts from Bauang, La Union, are longer but safer routes than Kennon Road. For this, they are preferred by coaches, buses and lorries. All three major highways traverse the municipality of Tuba, also known as the "Gateway to Baguio". A significant portion of Naguilian Road covers the municipality of Sablan.

From Itogon, Baguio is connected by the Baguio-Bua-Itogon Road, while La Trinidad's main access route to the city is via the Halsema Highway (also known as the "Mountain Trail"), which leads north through the mountainous portion of the Cordillera Administrative Region. The municipality of Tublay, situated at the north of La Trinidad, is likewise traversed by the Halsema Highway.

Another access to Baguio from Aritao in the Nueva Vizcaya province passes through Itogon, but is less traveled. The road is not well-maintained, and public transportation through this route is not as regular.

Several bus lines link Baguio with Manila and the rest of the lowlands. Most transportation companies also offer express and air-conditioned buses at a much higher fare, though some minibuses offer cheaper fares. Bus services that operate in Baguio include Philippine Rabbit, Dangwa Tranco, Dagupan Bus, Victory Liner, Partas, Genesis, and Saulog Transit.

By air
Loakan Airport is the lone airport serving the general area. The airport is classified as a trunkline airport, or a major commercial domestic airport, by the Civil Aviation Authority of the Philippines, a body of the Department of Transportation and Communications that is responsible for the operations of not only this airport but also of all other airports in the Philippines except the major international airports. It is about 10 minutes by car from the city center going south. Due to the limited length of the runway which is 1,802 meters or 5,912 feet, it is restricted to commuter size aircraft. This perhaps contributed to the city's declining competitiveness against other medium-sized cities around the country. The airport is used primarily by helicopters, turbo-prop and piston engine aircraft, although on rare occasion light business jets (LBJ) have flown into the airport.

References 

Baguio
Baguio